Dangerous Assignment was an NBC Radio drama starring Brian Donlevy broadcast in the US 1949–1953, a syndicated television series distributed in the US 1951–52 (also starring Brian Donlevy), and an Australian radio series broadcast in 1954-56 as remakes of the original American radio scripts.

Series premise 
"The Commissioner" sent US special agent Steve Mitchell to exotic locales all over the world, where he would encounter adventure and international intrigue in pursuit of some secret.  Each show would always open with a brief teaser scene from the episode to follow.  After the intro, Steve Mitchell would be summoned to the office of 'The Commissioner', the regional head of an unnamed US State Department agency created to address international unrest as it affected U.S. interests.  "The Commissioner" would give background information, explain the current situation and tell Steve his assignment.  Steve's cover identity, in almost all his adventures, was that of a suave debonair foreign correspondent for an unnamed print publication —  his assignments invariably involved deceit, trickery, and violence, all tied together into a successful resolution by the end of the episode.

Radio series 

Dangerous Assignment started out as a replacement radio series broadcast in the US on the NBC radio network in the summer of 1949; it became a syndicated series in early 1950.  Reportedly, star Brian Donlevy himself was the one who brought the show to NBC.

In the American radio shows, Donlevy was both the protagonist within the action and the narrator, giving the show "a suspenseful immediacy."  The only other regular actor on the radio shows was Herb Butterfield, who played "The Commissioner." Many stage and screen actors appeared as guest-stars including, among many others, William Conrad, Raymond Burr, Paul Frees, Jim Davis, Dan O'Herlihy, Richard Boone, and Eddie Cantor.

The Australian series was begun as a result of the popularity of the American series—scripts from shows already broadcast in the US were re-done with Australian actors in 1954.  The Australian producers re-created and broadcast thirty-nine episodes from 1954 on.

Summer 1949 series 
The radio show started out as a seven-week summer replacement series broadcast on NBC Saturdays 8:30–9 PM EST.  It premiered July 9, 1949; the last episode was on August 20, 1949. A character portraying the Commissioner's secretary, 'Ruthie', was played by Betty Moran — it is hinted that there was some romantic history between Ruthie and Steve Mitchell.

Episodes 
The seven episodes were each twenty-five minutes long:
 Thropp Foundation Stolen Relief Supplies, set in  Messina, Sicily, was broadcast July 9, 1949.
 Investigate Malayan Star Line Sabotage, set in Saigon, French Indochina, was broadcast July 16, 1949.
 On Safari for Nigerian Manganese, set in Nigeria, West Africa, was broadcast July 23, 1949.
 --Title Unknown--, set in Mexico City, Mexico, was broadcast July 30, 1949.
 Investigate Millionaire Murder Conspiracy, set in Paris, France, was broadcast August 6, 1949.
 Smash Illegal Alien Smuggling Ring, set in Masimbra, Portugal, was broadcast August 13, 1949.
 Recover File No. 307, set in Zurich, Switzerland, was broadcast August 20, 1949.

1950–1953 American series 
The Summer 1949 series was very well-received, but NBC had no room for a new series in its Fall 1949 schedule. The radio show finally did return to the airwaves on February 6, 1950, in the 10:30 PM Monday timeslot formerly occupied by The Dave Garroway Show (originating from Chicago and syndicated nationwide), which was moved an hour later to 11:30 PM.  The show moved over the next three years to Wednesday nights, then Saturday nights, then Tuesday nights, and then finally ended its run during its last few months in 1953 back on Wednesday nights.  Some of the sponsors included the Ford Motor Company, Wheaties cereal, Anacin painkiller, Chesterfield cigarettes, and the RCA Victor record label, but the show, for the most part, was sustained solely by the NBC network for over half of its entire run with promos for other NBC shows.  The series ran every week from its premiere date until the last show was broadcast in the US on July 8, 1953.

The second year of the radio series and the year of the television series were concurrent.

Episodes 
There are at least 160 episodes in the 1950–53 American radio series.  Episode titles became fairly standardized, starting with a verb, and describing the assignment: Find Szabo and The Briefcase, Keep Chromite Mine Operating, Intercept Dr. Korvel Before Opposition, etc.

1954 Australian series 
As the American radio series ended its last year, negotiation and production began for an Australian radio version.  Produced by Grace Gibson Transcriptions, this version of Dangerous Assignment re-did 52 episodes of the full American run, with Lloyd Burrell playing  Steve Mitchell — this radio series was broadcast in Australia in 1954 to 1956 and the following years.

Television series 

A syndicated television series named Dangerous Assignment was broadcast in the US in syndication (but mostly on the NBC television network) in the 1951–52 television season.  Donlevy formed a production company to convert the radio show to a television show — but, no TV network would invest in the series, so, instead, he produced thirty-nine episodes with his own cash and sold them to individual stations nationwide in First-Run Syndication (though NBC did aid in the distribution) — price per episode ranged from $75 to $2000, depending on the population and demographics in the buyer's region.

Production 
Production credits:
 Assistant Director: William McGarry
 Production Supervisor: Frank Parmenter
 Assistant Director: William McGarry
 Production Designer: George Van Marter
 Set Decoration: George Milo
 Film Editor: Edward Schroeder, A.C.E.
 Wardrobe: Charles Keehne
 Sound: Earl Snyder
 Makeup: David Newell
 Casting: Harvey Clermont
 Production Assistant: Edward Denault
 Special Effects: Harry Redmond Jr.

Episodes 
All episodes starred Brian Donlevy as Steve Mitchell and Herb Butterfield as "The Commissioner."  Robert Ryf wrote most of the scripts.  Among the more famous guest stars were Hugh Beaumont, Paul Frees, Elena Verdugo, Harry Guardino, Lyle Talbot, John Dehner, Michael Ansara, Jim Davis, and Strother Martin, many of them appearing as different characters in different episodes.

Critical reception 
The American radio show, perhaps due to the fact that it immediately preceded the blockbuster radio series The Man Called X, was extremely popular: "The program was clearly well received, was building a loyal audience for the full-hour block of foreign adventure drama it presented", although some radio fans found the American radio series "not quite overcoming the absolute predictability of the stories."

Radio fan response to the American television show was tepid: Seven years before "Mr. Lucky" and the "James Bond" character, Donlevy donned a dinner jacket for the TV series and attempted to look suave in his exploits, including the opening sequence during which he assumed a nonchalant pose as a dagger whizzed dangerously past his head.  Other than that, the series was a bit tedious, since Donlevy was not able to portray the confident nuances of the character type that was pioneered by Cary Grant and Sean Connery later, who played a dangerous situation with savoir faire (i.e., grace under pressure); one-dimensional situations and character attributes that might have gotten by on radio were a bit hard to swallow when you saw them acted out on television; and of course, as the old saying goes, perhaps "the pictures are better" on radio.

American television critics were not that much more enthusiastic: "...a television version of a pedestrian radio spy series."

References

External links 
 
 Dangerous Assignment at Classic Television Archive

Logs
 Log (and other information) of Dangerous Assignment radio series episodes from The Digital Deli Too
 Log of Dangerous Assignment radio series episodes from Jerry Haendiges Vintage Radio Logs
 Log of Dangerous Assignment radio series episodes from Old Time Radio Researchers Group
 Log of Dangerous Assignment radio series episodes from RadioGOLDINdex

Script
 Script of "Sunken Ships" episode of Dangerous Assignment radio program (July 16, 1949) from Generic Radio Workshop Script Library

Streaming

Radio
 Episodes of Dangerous Assignment radio series from Internet Archive
 Episodes of Dangerous Assignment radio series from Zoot Radio

Television
 "The Art Treasure Story" episode of Dangerous Assignment from Internet Archive
 "The Atomic Mine Story" episode of Dangerous Assignment from YouTube
 "The Bodyguard Story" episode of Dangerous Assignment from YouTube
 "The Briefcase Story episode of Dangerous Assignment from YouTube

1949 establishments in the United States
1949 radio programme debuts
1953 disestablishments in the United States
1953 radio programme endings
NBC radio programs
1940s American radio programs
1950s American radio programs
Radio programs adapted into television shows
American radio dramas
1951 American television series debuts
1952 American television series endings
Black-and-white American television shows
First-run syndicated television programs in the United States